Margrave Wilhelm of Baden (8 April 1792 in Karlsruhe – 11 October 1859 in Karlsruhe) was the second son of Karl Friedrich, Grand Duke of Baden and his second wife, Luise Karoline, Baroness Geyer von Geyersberg (26 May 1768 – 23 July 1820), the daughter of Lt. Col. Baron Ludwig Heinrich Philipp Geyer von Geyersberg and his wife, Countess Maximiliana Christiane von Sponeck. Because his marriage to Luise was considered by the House of Baden as morganatic, Wilhelm, for a time, had no succession rights to the Grand Duchy.

Marriage and family
He married on 16 October 1830, Duchess Elisabeth Alexandrine of Württemberg (27 February 1802 – 5 December 1864), the daughter of Duke Louis of Württemberg. They had the following children:

Princess Henriette of Baden (7 May 1833 – 7 August 1834)
Princess Sophie of Baden (7 August 1834 – 6 April 1904), married Woldemar, Prince of Lippe on 9 November 1858, no issue.
Princess Elisabeth of Baden (18 December 1835 – 15 May 1891)
Princess Leopoldine of Baden (22 February 1837 – 23 December 1903); married Hermann Ernst Franz Bernhard VI, Prince of Hohenlohe-Langenburg on 24 September 1862, and had issue.

Ancestry

1792 births
1859 deaths
Nobility from Karlsruhe
Wilhelm of Baden
Princes of Baden
Sons of monarchs